Wadi Al Rabi Stadium is a stadium currently under construction in Tripoli, Libya. It was planned to become a venue for the 2017 Africa Cup of Nations, where it would host the opening match and the final.

Football venues in Libya
Athletics (track and field) venues in Libya
Sports venues in Libya
Multi-purpose stadiums in Libya
Stadiums under construction